Route 151, or Highway 151, may refer to:

Canada
 Prince Edward Island Route 151

Costa Rica
 National Route 151

India
 National Highway 151 (India)

Ireland
 R151 road (Ireland)

Japan
 Japan National Route 151

Korea, South
 Seocheon–Gongju Expressway

United States
 U.S. Route 151
 Alabama State Route 151
 Arkansas Highway 151
 California State Route 151
 Colorado State Highway 151
 Connecticut Route 151
 Florida State Road 151
 Georgia State Route 151
Hawaii Route 151 (former)
 Illinois Route 151
 Kentucky Route 151
 Louisiana Highway 151
 Maine State Route 151
 Maryland Route 151
 Massachusetts Route 151
 M-151 (Michigan Highway) (former)
 Missouri Route 151
 New Hampshire Route 151
 New Jersey Route 151 (former)
 New York State Route 151
 North Carolina Highway 151
 Ohio State Route 151
 Oklahoma State Highway 151
 Pennsylvania Route 151
 South Carolina Highway 151
 Tennessee State Route 151
 Texas State Highway 151
 Texas State Highway Loop 151
 Texas State Highway Spur 151
 Utah State Route 151
 Virginia State Route 151
 Washington State Route 151 (former)
 Wyoming Highway 151
Territories
 Puerto Rico Highway 151